Oliver Roggisch (born 25 August 1978 in Villingen-Schwenningen) is a retired German team handball player who played for Rhein-Neckar Löwen.He currently serves as the sporting director for the Löwen as well as for the German national team. Roggisch is a World champion from 2007 with the German national team. He participated for the German team that finished fourth at the 2008 European Men's Handball Championship.

Club player
Roggisch won the EHF Cup in 2007 with the club SC Magdeburg.

References

1978 births
Living people
German male handball players
Handball players at the 2008 Summer Olympics
Olympic handball players of Germany
SC Magdeburg players
Rhein-Neckar Löwen players
Frisch Auf Göppingen players
People from Villingen-Schwenningen
Sportspeople from Freiburg (region)